The  is a line of downloadable Namco arcade games by Bandai Namco Entertainment for PlayStation 4, Xbox One, and Microsoft Windows. They were all released on April 20, 2016.

Games

Pac-Man Championship Edition 2 + Arcade Game Series
A retail disc containing three of the Arcade Game Series games (Pac-Man, Galaga, and Dig Dug) compiled with Pac-Man Championship Edition 2 was released for PlayStation 4 and Xbox One on November 1, 2016 in North America.

See also
 List of Bandai Namco video game compilations

Notes

References

External links
  

Arcade video games
PlayStation 4 games
Xbox One games
Windows games
Namco games
Bandai Namco Entertainment franchises
Bandai Namco video game compilations
PlayStation Network games
2016 video games
Video games developed in Japan